Percival Alger (born 26 October 1964) is a Filipino fencer. He competed in the individual sabre event at the 1988 Summer Olympics.

References

External links
 

1964 births
Living people
Olympic fencers of the Philippines
Fencers at the 1988 Summer Olympics
Filipino male sabre fencers